= Yannis Dounias =

Greek Laïko singer

Yannis Dounias Γιάννης Ντουνιάς
- Birth name: Yannis Dounias
- Born: 17 October 1943 (age 81); Athens, Greece
- Genres: Laïko
- Occupation: Musician
- Years active: 1968–present
- Labels: Δίκτυο

Yannis Dounias (Γιάννης Ντουνιάς, born 17 October 1943 in Athens) is a Greek Laïko singer. He released over a dozen of full-length albums, on labels ranging from Polydor Records and Philips Records to independent ones. He is best known for his albums Έμπαινε Γιώργο έμπαινε (Getting Giorget Into) (1969) and Κρίμα μου και κρίμα σου (My Shame and Your Pity) (1974). He is married to his wife since 1969 and has three children, two sons and a daughter.
